Curt Christensen (12 March 1920 – 14 December 2004) was a Danish footballer. He played in one match for the Denmark national football team in 1949.

References

External links
 
 

1920 births
2004 deaths
Danish men's footballers
Denmark international footballers
People from Esbjerg
Association football midfielders
Esbjerg fB players